The 2013 UEFA Women's Under-17 Championship qualification were two rounds of qualifying tournaments for the 2013 UEFA Women's Under-17 Championship, held in Switzerland.

With a return of Slovakia, who haven't been played since the inaugural edition, and Under-17 newcomers Montenegro a new record of 44 participating nations was set. The 44 UEFA members were divided into 11 groups of four teams, with each group being contested as a mini-tournament, hosted by one of the group's teams. After all matches have been played, the 11 group winners and the five best runner-up teams will advance to the second round.

The draw was made on 15 November 2011. Matches were played from 28 August 2012 to 3 November 2012.

First round

Seeding
The seedings were done according to the Under-17 coefficient ranking. There were three pots, with the eleven highest ranked strongest teams in Pot A, the next eleven in Pot B and the rest in Pot C.

Pot A
 Germany, Spain, France, Netherlands, Norway, Republic of Ireland, Sweden, Czech Republic, Switzerland, Denmark, England
Pot B
 Belgium, Italy, Iceland, Scotland, Poland, Finland, Wales, Russia, Hungary, Ukraine, Austria
Pot C
 Serbia, Slovenia, Turkey, Romania, Belarus, Lithuania, Former Yugoslav Republic of Macedonia, Croatia, Greece, Estonia, Kazakhstan, Faroe Islands, Latvia, Northern Ireland, Israel, Azerbaijan, Moldova, Bulgaria, Georgia, Bosnia and Herzegovina, Montenegro, Slovakia

The hosts of the eleven one-venue mini-tournament groups are indicated below.

Tiebreakers
Tie-breakers between teams with the same number of points are:
 Higher number of points obtained in the matches played between the teams in question
 Superior goal difference resulting from the matches played between the teams in question
 Higher number of goals scored in the matches played between the teams in question
If now two teams still are tied, reapply tie-breakers 1–3, if this does not break the tie, go on.
 Superior goal difference in all group matches
 Higher number of goals scored in all group matches
 Drawing of lots

Group 1

Group 2

Group 3

Group 4

Group 5

Group 6
Due to heavy snow matches set for 29 October had to be postponed a day. As a result, the second matchday was set back a day also.

Group 7

Group 8
Vivianne Miedema's eight goals in the match against Kazakhstan set a new competition record.

Group 9

Group 10

Group 11

Ranking of runner-up teams
To determine the five best runners-up from the first qualifying round, only the results against the winners and third-placed teams in each group were taken into account.

The following criteria are applied to determine the rankings:
higher number of points obtained in these matches
superior goal difference from these matches
higher number of goals scored in these matches
fair play conduct of the teams in all group matches in the first qualifying round
drawing of lots

Second round

Format
16 team are drawn into four groups of four. The teams then play each other once. After that only the group winners advance to the final tournament.

Seedings
The draw was held on 20 November 2012 in Nyon. Teams are seeded based on their first round performances. In the draw one team per pot will be drawn together.

The hosts of the four one-venue mini-tournament groups are indicated below.

Group 1
Group 1 was played in Belgium. Both matches in the final round was originally scheduled to be played simultaneously at 12 March 17:00, Denmark facing Netherlands in Tessenderlo and Belgium playing Germany in Tongeren, but due to heavy snow they were moved to the next day in Genk. Snowy weather however postponed them again in Genk. For the first time Belgium qualified to the final tournament. Also for the first time Germany missed out on qualifying.

Group 2
Group 2 was played in Austria. The last matchday was set to be played on 31 March 2013, but was cancelled due to heavy snowfalls. Matches were played on 14 April 2013.

Group 3
Group 3 was played in France.

Group 4
Group 4 was played in the Czech Republic.

References

External links
UEFA.com
Tournament Regulations
2013 tournament  on soccerway.com

UEFA
qualification
2013
2013 in youth sport